Anne of Auvergne also known as Anna d'Auvergne (1358 – 22 September 1417) was Sovereign Dauphine of Auvergne 1400-1417 and Countess of Forez in 1372-1417 as well as Dame de Mercoeur  from 1400 and 1417. She was also Duchess of Bourbon by marriage to Louis II, Duke of Bourbon.

Life
Anne's mother, Jeanne d'Ussel, died when she was around eleven years of age. Her father remarried two more times; she gained several half-siblings from her father's third marriage to Margaret of Sancerre.

Duchess of Bourbon
Anne was betrothed to her cousin Louis when she was ten years old. The marriage contract was signed at Montbrison on 4 July 1368 and the pair were married in person at Ardes in January 1370. Due to the fact that the couple were cousins, a papal dispensation was required; this was granted to them by the Pope on 15 September 1370.

Countess of Forez
On 15 May 1372, Anne's uncle, John Count of Forez, died leaving no children. Anne was his heir, as all of John's siblings had died including Anne's mother Jeanne and she had been the only one to leave a child, namely Anne. At the time of her accession, Anne was still only a minor (aged fourteen) so her grandmother, Joan of Clermont, acted as regent until Anne reached her majority, at which time she ruled together with Louis.

Dauphine of Auvergne
In 1400, Anne's father died and he left her the Dauphinate of Auvergne, which she ruled over for the next seventeen years. Anne also founded an anniversary for her stepmother Margaret  Ten years after the death of her father, Anne was widowed; her husband, Louis, died in 1410 at Montluçon and their older son John succeeded him as duke. Anne ruled over her Dauphinate for another seven years, until her own death at Moulins on 22 September 1417. She was outlived by her son John and daughter Isabelle; her son inherited Forez and her grandson, Louis I, Count of Montpensier, eventually inherited the Dauphinate.

Issue
 Catherine of Bourbon (b. 1378), d. young
 John of Bourbon (1381–1434), Duke of Bourbon
 Louis of Bourbon (1388 – 1404), Sieur de Beaujeu
 Isabelle of Bourbon (1384 – aft. 1451), engaged to Eric of Pomerania but eventually became a nun.
Of their four children, John and Isabelle reached adulthood; only John having had children of his own.

References
 Dominique Laurent, « Anne Dauphine, duchesse de Bourbon, comtesse de Forez et dame de Beaujeu », in Forez et Bourbon. Les ducs de Bourbon, maîtres du Forez aux XIVe et XVe siècles, Actes du colloque de Montbrison du 23 octobre 2010, sous la direction d'Olivier Troubat et Christophe Mathevot, Montbrison, La Diana, 2011, pp. 25–39.

1358 births
1417 deaths
Burials at Souvigny Priory
14th-century French nobility
15th-century French nobility
15th-century women rulers
14th-century French women
15th-century French women
15th-century French people
14th-century women rulers